The Twelve Conclusions of the Lollards is a Middle English religious text containing statements by leaders of the English medieval movement, the Lollards, inspired by teachings of John Wycliffe. The Conclusions were written in 1395. The text was presented to the Parliament of England and nailed to the doors of Westminster Abbey and St Paul's Cathedral as a placard (a typical medieval method for publishing). The manifesto suggests the expanded treatise Thirty-Seven Conclusions (Thirty-seven Articles against Corruptions in the Church) for those that wished more in-depth information.

Twelve conclusions
The text summarizes twelve areas in which the Lollards argued that the Christian Church in England needed reform.

First conclusion: state of the Church

The first conclusion asserts that the English Church has become too involved in affairs of temporal power, led by the bad example of the Church of Rome.

Second conclusion: the priesthood
The second conclusion asserts that the ceremonies used for the ordination of priests and bishops are without scriptural basis or precedent.

Third conclusion: clerical celibacy
The third conclusion asserts that the practice of clerical celibacy has encouraged sodomy among the clergy.

Fourth conclusion: transubstantiation
The fourth conclusion asserts that the doctrine of transubstantiation leads to idolatrous worship of everyday objects (the communion wafers).

Fifth conclusion: exorcisms and hallowings
The fifth conclusion asserts that the exorcisms and hallowings carried out by priests are a sort of witchcraft and are incompatible with Christian theology.

Sixth conclusion: clerics in secular offices
The sixth conclusion asserts that it is inappropriate for men who hold high office in the Church to simultaneously hold positions of great temporal power.

Seventh conclusion: prayers for the dead
The seventh conclusion asserts that prayers for the souls of specific individual deceased persons is uncharitable, since it implicitly excludes all the other blessed dead who are not being prayed for, and that the practice of requesting prayers for the dead by making financial contributions is a sort of bribery that corrupts the Church.

Eighth conclusion: pilgrimages
The eighth conclusion asserts that the practices of pilgrimage and the veneration of relics at best are ineffectual for spiritual merit and at worst approach idolatry in their worship of created objects.

Ninth conclusion: confession
The ninth conclusion asserts that the practice of confession for the absolution of sins is blasphemous because only God has the power to forgive sins and because if priests did have that power it would be cruel and uncharitable of them to withhold that forgiveness from anyone, even if they refused to confess.

Tenth conclusion: war, battle, and crusades
The tenth conclusion asserts that Christians should refrain from battle and in particular wars that are given religious justifications, such as crusades, are blasphemous because Christ taught men to love and forgive their enemies.

Eleventh conclusion: female vows of continence and abortion
The eleventh conclusion asserts that women in the Church who have made vows of celibacy are having sex, becoming pregnant, and then seeking abortions to conceal the fact that they had broken their vows, a practice which the text strongly condemns.

Twelfth conclusion: arts and crafts
The twelfth conclusion asserts that Christians are devoting too much of their energy and attention to the making of beautiful objects of art and craft, and that people should simplify their lives and renew their devotion to godliness by refraining from unnecessary endeavors.

General Prologue to the Wycliffe Bible 
The General Prologue of the Wycliffe Bible to the later version (1395) gives an allusion to the Lollard Twelve Conclusions by the use of the words "last parliament". It gives an indication that the General Prologue was written in 1395–1397 for the previous parliament that just took place in 1395 and before the next parliament that took place in 1397. The Twelve Conclusions and its expanded version of Thirty-Seven Conclusions is attributed to the author of the General Prologue of the Wycliffe Bible, John Purvey, written 1395.

See also
 Trial of John Rykener

Notes

References
 Deanesly, Margaret, The Lollard Bible and other medieval Biblical versions, Cambridge University Press, 1920
 Forshall, Josiah, The holy bible containing the old and new testaments with the apocryphal books in the earliest english versions made from the latin Vulgate by John Wycliffe and his followers edited by Josiah Forshall and Sir Frederic Madden, Austrian National Library, University press 1850

External links

 Text of the Twelve Conclusions of the Lollards, translated from Middle English. 

Lollardy
Religion and politics
1390s works
1390s in England
14th-century Christian texts